Inonotus munzii is a plant pathogen that causes wood rot on Platanus species.

References

External links 
 Index Fungorum
 USDA ARS Fungal Database

Fungal tree pathogens and diseases
munzii
Fungi described in 1969